, OECU is a private university in Japan. The main campus is located in  Neyagawa-shi, Osaka Prefecture.

History
The predecessor of the school was founded in 1924, and it was chartered as a university in 1961.

In 1924,  was established.
In 1932,  was established.
In September, 'Osaka musen denki gakko' and 'Osaka Communications Engineering Senior High School' were transferred to 'Kanritsu Musen Denshin Kōshūjo' Governmentally school of Osaka, by National Mobilization Law, Japan.
In 1951, East Asia Electro-Communication Senior High-School and attached Junior high-school were changed to 'Osaka Electro-communication High-school', 'Osaka Electro-communication Junior high-school'. 'Osaka musen denki gakko' was continued. 'Incorporated foundation of East Asia Electro-Communication Senior High School' was reorganized to  incorporated educational institution.
In 1954, 'Osaka Electro-communication junior high-school' was closed.
In 1956, 'Osaka Musen Denki Gakko' was integrated to 'Osaka Electro-communication High-school'.
In 1958, 'Osaka Electro-Communication University Junior College' and 'Department of Electronics Engineering' was established. Corporate body name was changed to 'Osaka Electro-communication Academy'.
In 1960, 'Osaka Electro-communication junior High-school' was continued.
In 1961, 'Osaka Electro-Communication University', 'Faculty of Engineering', and 'Electronics Engineering'was established. (In private universities in Japan, This is the first Department of Electronics Engineering.)
In 1962, 'Department of Telecommunications and Computer Networks' was established in Faculty of Engineering. 'Osaka Electro-communication Junior college' was changed to Attached Junior college of University.
In 1965, 'Department of Electronic Property Engineering', 'Department of Electro-Mechanical Engineering', 'Department of Industrial and Management Engineering' was add in Faculty of Engineering.
In 1973, 'Osaka Electro-communication Academy' was changed to 'Osaka Electro-communication University'.
In 1975, 'Department of Precision Engineering' and 'Department of Practical Engineering' was add in Faculty of Engineering.
In 1987 October, 'Shijōnawate Campus'was opened.
In 1990, 'Engineering Master's program of Graduate school' was established at University. 'Division of Electronics and Applied Physics', 'Division of Mechanical and Control Engineering', and 'Division of Information and Computer Sciences' were established at Graduate school. 'Department of Electronic Engineering' at Junior college was changed to 'Department of Electronic Information'.
In 1992, 'Engineering Doctor's program of Graduate school' was established at University. 'Division of Electronics and Applied Physics', 'Division of Mechanical and Control Engineering', and 'Division of Information and Computer Sciences' were established at Doctor's program of Graduate school.
In 1995, 'Faculty of Engineering Informatics' was established. It include 'Department of Engineering Informatics' changed from 'Department of Management Engineering'.
In 1996, 'Department of Precision Engineering' was changed to 'Department of Intelligent Machinery Engineering'.
In 1997, 'Department of Electronic Property Engineering' was changed to 'Department of Electronic Material Engineering', and 'Department of Practical Engineering' was changed to 'Department of Photonic System Engineering'.
In 1998, 'Faculty of Engineering, 2nd Division' was established, and 'Faculty of Engineering' was changed to 'Faculty of Engineering, 1st Division'.
In 1999, 'Department of Management Engineering' in Faculty of Engineering was closed.
In 2000, 'Department of Engineering Informatics' was changed to 'Faculty of Information Science and Arts'. 'Department of Media, Information, and Culture' was established at 'Faculty of Information Science and Arts'.
In 2001, 'Division of Electronics and Communication Engineering' at Junior college was closed. 'KONAMI Hall' was established at 'Sijonawate Campus'. 'Department of Biomedical Engineering' was established at Faculty of Engineering.
In 2002, 'Department of Intelligent Machinery Engineering' was changed to 'Department of Mechanical Engineering' at (1st and 2nd Division,) Faculty of Engineering. The junior college's 2nd division was closed.
In 2003, 'Department of Digital Games' was established at Faculty of Information Science and Arts.
In 2004, 'Department of Biomedical Engineering' at Faculty of Engineering, 1st Division was closed, and
'Department of Biomedical Engineering' of 'Faculty of Biomedical Engineering' was established. The Master's course of 'Division of Media, Information, and Culture' was established at Graduate school of Information Science and Arts.
In 2005, 'Faculty of Information and Communication Engineering' was established. It include 'Department of Telecommunications and Computer Networks' (from 1st Division, Faculty of Engineering), 'Department of Photonic System Engineering', and 'Department of Engineering Informatics' (from Faculty of Information Science and Arts). 'Department of Computer Science' was established at 'Faculty of Information Science and Arts'.
In 2006,  'Department of Environmental Science' was established at Faculty of Engineering, 1st Division. 'Department of Physical Therapy' was established at 'Faculty of Biomedical Engineering'. The Doctoral course of 'Division of Electronics and Communication Engineering' was established at Graduate School of Engineering. The Master's course of 'Division of Computer Science' was established at Graduate School of Information Science and Arts. 'Department of Media, Information, and Culture' was changed to 'Department of Digital Art and Animation'.
In 2007, '1st Division, Faculty of Engineering' was changed to 'Faculty of Engineering'. 'Department of Engineering Science' was established at Faculty of Engineering. 'Division of Media, Information, and Culture' at Graduate School of Information Science and Arts was changed to 'Division of Digital Art and Animation'. The 'Graduate School of Information Science and Arts Doctoral Course' was established. The 'Graduate School of Biomedical Engineering Doctoral Course' was established.
In 2008, 'Department of Health-Promotion and Sports Science' was established at Faculty of Biomedical Engineering.
In 2009, 'Department of Electronic Engineering' at Faculty of Engineering' changed to 'Department of Electrical and Electronic Engineering'. 'Department of Assets Management' was established at 'Faculty of Financial Economy'.

Faculty and Department
In this university, those departments and faculties use a letter for alias.
E Faculty of Engineering
E  Department of Electronic Engineering and Computer Science
H Department of Electro-Mechanical Engineering
J Department of Mechanical Engineering
Z Department of Environment Science
N Department of Engineering Science
F Faculty of Biomedical Engineering
L Department of Biomedical Engineering
Y Physical therapy
S Department of Health and Sports Science
G Faculty of Information and Communication Engineering
P Department of Engineering Informatics
F Department of Telecommunications and Computer Networks
H Faculty of Information Science and Arts
Q Department of Digital Art and Animation
W Department of Digital Games
T Department of Computer Science
I Faculty of Financial Economy
A Department of Asset Management
C 2nd Division, Faculty of Engineering

Graduate school
 Graduate School of Engineering
 Graduate School of Biomedical Engineering
 Graduate school of Information Science and Arts

References

External links
 Official website (Japanese)
 Official website (English)

Educational institutions established in 1924
Private universities and colleges in Japan
Universities and colleges in Osaka Prefecture
Engineering universities and colleges in Japan
Kansai Collegiate American Football League
1924 establishments in Japan
Neyagawa, Osaka